Santa Rita Biological Reserve is a biological reserve in the state of Minas Gerais, Brazil.

The reserve was established in the municipality of Santa Rita do Sapucaí by municipal law 1096 on 15 October 1980, with revised municipal laws on 27 October 1980 and 19 December 1984 and the Federal SNUC law 9985 on 18 June 2000.
Any form of exploitation of the natural resources of the reserve is prohibited.

Notes

Sources

1980 establishments in Brazil
Biological reserves of Brazil
Protected areas of Minas Gerais
Protected areas established in 1980
Protected areas of the Atlantic Forest